Twenty-six Men and a Girl is a 1899 short story by the Russian writer Maxim Gorky and one of his most famous works. Twenty-six Men and a Girl  has been praised by critics for sympathetic tone and rhythmic prose, particularly evident in the emotional folk songs of the bakers.

Plot 
"Twenty-six Men and a Girl" is a pioneering story of social realism, and is a story of lost ideals. Twenty-six men labor in a cellar, making kringles in an effective prison. They are looked down upon by all around them, including the bun bakers. Their only seeming solace is the sixteen-year-old Tanya who visits them every morning for kringles they give her.

A new baker, a soldier, joins the bun bakers. Unlike all others they know, he befriends them, boasting of his virility with women. He ultimately seduces Tanya.

Upon learning about this, the bakers surround Tanya and yell abuse at her. After regaining her composure, she rebukes them. Afterwards, Tanya never stops at the bakery again.

Reception

References

External links
Creative Commons English translation
Another version in English
Story in original Russian

1899 short stories
Short stories by Maxim Gorky